The Marche slave in B-flat minor, Op. 31, is an orchestral tone poem by Pyotr Ilyich Tchaikovsky published in 1876.  It was written to celebrate Russia's intervention in the Serbo-Ottoman War.

Titling
It has been published variously as Slavic March ( / Slovenski marš), Slavonic March, and Serbo-Russian March ( / Srpsko-ruski marš).

Background
In June 1876, Serbia and the Ottoman Empire were engaged in the Serbian-Ottoman War, in which Russia openly supported Serbia. The Russian Musical Society commissioned an orchestral piece from Tchaikovsky for a concert in aid of the Red Cross Society, and ultimately for the benefit of wounded Serbian veterans. Many Russians sympathized with their fellow Slavs and Orthodox Christians and sent volunteer soldiers and aid to assist Serbia.

Tchaikovsky referred to the piece as his "Serbo-Russian March" while writing it.

The march is highly programmatic in its form and organization. The first section, written in the somber key of B-flat minor, describes the oppression of the Serbs by the Ottoman Turks. It uses two Serbian folk songs, "Sunce jarko, ne sijaš jednako" (Bright sun, you do not shine equally), by Isidor Ćirić and "Rado ide Srbin u vojnike" (Gladly does the Serb become a soldier) by Josip Runjanin. This eventually gives way to the second section, written in the relative key of D-flat major, which describes the Russians rallying to help the Serbs. This is based on a simple melody with the character of a rustic dance that is passed around the orchestra, until finally it gives way to a solemn statement of the Russian imperial anthem "God Save the Tsar". The third section of the piece is a repeat of Tchaikovsky's furious orchestral climax from the first section, reiterating the Serbian cry for help. The fourth and final section describes the Russian volunteers marching into battle to assist the Serbs. It uses a Russian folk tune, this time in the tonic D-flat major key and includes another blazing rendition of "God Save the Tsar", prophesying the triumph of the Slavonic people over the Ottomans. The overture finishes with a virtuoso coda for the full orchestra.

The piece is frequently paired in performance with Tchaikovsky's "1812 Overture," which also quotes "God Save the Tsar." In Russia, during the Soviet era, the imperial anthem was replaced in both pieces with the chorus "Glory, Glory to you, holy Rus'!" (Славься, славься, святая Русь!), which ironically came from the finale of Mikhail Glinka's opéra A Life for the Tsar, a historical drama about a patriotic commoner named Ivan Susanin. The original version of the song, written by Vasily Zhukovsky and Egor Fyodorovich Rozen, praised the Tsar and the Russian Tsardom, while the latter version by Sergey Gorodetsky was one of a patriotic form and is sometimes regarded as the unofficial anthem of Russia in the 20th century and even today. With the dissolution of the Soviet Union at the end of the Cold War, the original scores of both pieces returned.

Instrumentation
The march is scored for two flutes, two piccolos, two oboes, two clarinets in B flat, two bassoons, four horns in F, two cornets in B flat, two trumpets in B flat, three trombones (two tenor, one bass), tuba, three timpani, snare drum, cymbals, bass drum, tamtam, and strings.

Notable performances
Sir Adrian Boult conducting the London Philharmonic Orchestra
Antal Doráti conducting the Detroit Symphony Orchestra
Charles Dutoit conducting the Montreal Symphony Orchestra
Claudio Abbado conducting the Berlin Philharmonic
Herbert von Karajan conducting the Berlin Philharmonic
Bernard Haitink conducting the Royal Concertgebouw Orchestra of Amsterdam
Fritz Reiner conducting the Chicago Symphony Orchestra
Leonard Slatkin conducting the Saint Louis Symphony Orchestra
Leopold Stokowski conducting the London Symphony Orchestra
Neeme Järvi conducting the Gothenburg Symphony
Leonard Bernstein conducting the Israel Philharmonic Orchestra
Eugene Ormandy conducting the Philadelphia Orchestra
Gennady Rozhdestvensky conducting the London Symphony Orchestra
Yuri Temirkanov conducting the Royal Philharmonic Orchestra
Valery Gergiev conducting the Mariinsky Theatre Orchestra

See also
Russo-Turkish War (1877–1878)

References

Sources
Brown D (1982) "Tchaikovsky: A Biographical and Critical Study, Volume 2 The Crisis Years 1874–1878" pp. 99–102 Victor Gollancz London. 
Garden E (1973) "Tchaikovsky" p. 67 JM Dent and Sons

External links

Tchaikovsky Research oeke
Downloadable recordings of the march
Slavonic March on Youtube
Slavonic March on Youtube

Compositions by Pyotr Ilyich Tchaikovsky
1876 compositions
March music
Compositions for symphony orchestra
1876 in the Russian Empire
19th century in Serbia
Compositions in B-flat minor
Russia–Serbia relations
Pan-Slavism
Compositions using folk songs
Music and politics